Herd effect may refer to:

 Herd immunity
 Herd effect, a derogatory term for peer pressure, an easily manipulated population as a herd of sheep